The Harmonized Commodity Description and Coding System, also known as the Harmonized System (HS) of tariff nomenclature is an internationally standardized system of names and numbers to classify traded products. It came into effect in 1988 and has since been developed and maintained by the World Customs Organization (WCO) (formerly the Customs Co-operation Council), an independent intergovernmental organization based in Brussels, Belgium, with over 200 member countries.

Structure
The HS is organized logically by economic activity or component material. For example, animals and animal products are found in one section of the HS, while machinery and mechanical appliances are found in another. The HS is organized into 21 sections, which are subdivided into 99 chapters. The 99 HS chapters are further subdivided into 1,244 headings and 5224 subheadings.

Section and Chapter titles describe broad categories of goods, while headings and subheadings describe products in more detail. Generally, HS sections and chapters are arranged in order of a product's degree of manufacture or in terms of its technological complexity. Natural commodities, such as live animals and vegetables, for example, are described in the early sections of the HS, whereas more evolved goods such as machinery and precision instruments are described in later sections. Chapters within the individual sections are also usually organized in order of complexity or degree of manufacture.  For example, within Section X (Pulp of wood or of other fibrous cellulosic material; Recovered (waste and scrap) paper or paperboard; Paper and paperboard and articles thereof), Chapter 47 provides for pulp of wood or of other fibrous cellulosic materials, whereas Chapter 49 covers printed books, newspapers, and other printed matter. Finally, the headings within individual Chapters follow a similar order.  For example, the first heading in Chapter 50 (Silk) provides for silk worm cocoons while articles made of silk are covered by the chapter's later headings.

The HS code consists of 6-digits. The first two digits designate the HS Chapter. The second two digits designate the HS heading. The third two digits designate the HS subheading. HS code 1006.30, for example indicates Chapter 10 (Cereals), Heading 06 (Rice), and Subheading 30 (Semi-milled or wholly milled rice, whether or not polished or glazed).

In addition to the HS codes and commodity descriptions, each Section and Chapter of the HS is prefaced by Legal Notes, which are designed to clarify the proper classification of goods.

To ensure harmonization, the contracting parties to the Convention on the Harmonized Commodity Description and Coding System, have agreed to base their national tariff schedules on the HS nomenclature and Legal Notes. Parties are permitted to subdivide the HS nomenclature beyond 6-digits and add their own Legal Notes according to their own tariff and statistical requirements. Parties often set their customs duties at the 8-digit "tariff code" level. Statistical suffixes are often added to the 8-digit tariff code for a total of 10 digits. If the number of digits are more than 8, additional digits are called as the national subheading.

HS Chapter 77 is reserved for common use by the parties internationally. Chapters 98 and 99 are reserved for national use. Chapter 98 comprises special classification provisions, and chapter 99 contains temporary modifications pursuant to a parties' national directive or legislation.

Since its creation, the HS has undergone several revisions - ostensibly, to either eliminate headings and subheadings describing commodities that are no longer traded, or to create headings and subheadings that address technological advancements and environmental concerns. The current version of the HS became effective on 1 January 2017.

Classification
The process of assigning HS codes is known as "HS Classification". All products can be classified in the HS by using the General Rules for the Interpretation of the Harmonized System ("GRI"). HS codes can be determined by a variety of factors including a product's composition, its form and its function. An example of a product classified according to its form would be whole potatoes. The classification will also change depending on whether the potatoes are fresh or frozen. Fresh potatoes are classified in position 0701.90, under the Header Potatoes, fresh or chilled, Sub header Other, while frozen potatoes are classified in position 0710.10 under the Header Vegetables (uncooked or cooked by steaming or boiling in water), frozen, Subheader Potatoes. The Harmonized System has six general interpretative rules that must be analyzed in strict order.

An example of a product classified according its material composition is a picture frame.  Picture frames made of wood are classified under subheading 4414.00, which provides for Wooden frames for paintings, photographs, mirrors or similar objects. Picture frames made of plastic are classified under subheading 3924.90, which provides for Tableware, kitchenware, other household articles and hygienic or toilet articles, of plastics. Other. Picture frames made of glass are classified under subheading 7020.00, which provides for Other articles of glass. And so on.

An example of a product classified according to its form is personal hygiene soap. When in the form of a bar, cake or moulded shape, such soap is classified under subheading 3401.11, which provides for Soap and organic surface-active products and preparations, in the form of bars, cakes, moulded pieces or shapes, and paper, wadding, felt and nonwovens, impregnated, coated or covered with soap or detergent: For toilet use (including medicated products). Conversely, liquid personal hygiene soap is classified under either 3401.20, which provides for Soap in other forms, or 3401.30, which provides for Organic surface-active products and preparations for washing the skin, in the form of liquid or cream and put up for retail sale, whether or not containing soap.

An example of a product classified according to its function is a carbon monoxide (CO) detector. If the CO detector captures and displays gas measurements, then it is properly classified under subheading 9027.10, which provides for Instruments and apparatus for physical or chemical analysis (for example, polarimeters, refractometers, spectrometers, gas or smoke analysis apparatus; instruments and apparatus for measuring or checking viscosity, porosity, expansion, surface tension or the like; instruments and apparatus for measuring or checking quantities of heat, sound or light (including exposure meters); microtomes. Gas or smoke analysis apparatus. If the CO detector does not capture and display gas measurements, then it is properly classified under subheading 8531.10, which provides for Electric sound or visual signaling apparatus (for example, bells, sirens, indicator panels, burglar or fire alarms), other than those of heading 85.12 or 85.30. Burglar or fire alarms and similar apparatus.

Although every product and every part of every product is classifiable in the HS, very few are explicitly described in the HS nomenclature. Any product for which there is no explicit description can be classified under a "residual" or "basket" heading or subheading, which provide for Other goods. Residual codes normally occur last in numerical order under their related headings and subheadings.

An example of a product classified under a residual heading is a live dog, which must be classified under heading 01.06, which provides for Other live animals because dogs are not covered by headings 01.01 through 01.05, which explicitly provide for live equine, live bovine, live swine, live sheep and goats, and live poultry, respectively.

Applications
As of 2015, there were 180 countries or territories applying the Harmonized System worldwide,

HS code are used by Customs authorities, statistical agencies, and other government regulatory bodies, to monitor and control the import and export of commodities through:
 Customs tariffs
 Collection of trade data (international trade statistics)
 Rules of origin
 Collection of internal taxes
 Trade negotiations (e.g., the World Trade Organization schedules of tariff concessions)
 Transport tariffs and statistics
 Monitoring of controlled goods (e.g., wastes, narcotics, chemical weapons, ozone layer depleting substances, endangered species, wildlife trade)
 Areas of Customs controls and procedures, including risk assessment, information technology and compliance.

Companies use HS codes to calculate the total landed cost of imported products and parts, and to identify selling and sourcing opportunities abroad.

Challenges in classification for companies

HS classification is not always straightforward. Many automotive parts, for example, are not classified under heading 87.08, which provides for Parts and accessories of the motor vehicles of headings 87.01 to 87.05. Automotive seats are classified as articles of furniture under heading 94.01, which provides for Seats (other than those of heading 94.02), whether or not convertible into beds, and parts thereof, and more specifically under subheading 9401.20, which provides for Seats of a kind used for motor vehicles.

In many jurisdictions, traders alone bear the legal responsibility to accurately classify their goods. However, due to a lack of familiarity with the rules of HS Classification traders may inadvertently determine erroneous HS codes for their commodities. Depending on the severity of the infraction, incorrect classification can result in the imposition of non-compliance penalties, border delays or seizures, or denial of import privileges.

See also
 Automated Export System
 Broad Economic Categories
 Combined Nomenclature
 Customs tariff
 Harmonized Tariff Schedule for the United States
 Standard International Trade Classification
 TARIC Coding System
 UNSPSC
 World Customs Organization

References

External links
 World Bank's list of HS Codes products
 World Bank, Concordances from HS to other nomenclatures
 EU Combined Nomenclature Search Engine by European Commission - Eurostat
 United Nations Harmonised System

Tariffs by region
 Customs Tariff of Canada (Canada Border Services Agency)
 Integrated Tariff of the European Union - TARIC
 Central Excise Tariff of India by Department of Customs, Ministry of Revenue
 East Africa Community Common External Tariff by Customs and Trade, East Africa Community, Governments of Burundi, Rwanda, Kenya, Uganda and the United Republic of Tanzania
 Japan Tariff Association –  webpage refers to Japan Harmonised System Code Search
 Mexico import-export codes (Harmonized Tariff Schedule) by SIICEX and CAAAREM
 UK Tariff Codes Datasets by Data.Gov.UK
 Official Tariff Book of South Africa (South African Revenue Service)
 United States of America
 U.S. import codes (Harmonized Tariff Schedule) by U.S. International Trade Commission
 U.S. export codes by U.S. Census Bureau
 Australian Customs & Border Protection Service - Working tariff 2012

Standards
Product classifications
Chemical numbering schemes
World Customs Organization